By Appointment Only is a 2007 thriller television film stars and written by Ally Walker. Jordan Garrett received a nomination for Best Performance in a TV Movie, Miniseries or Special – Supporting Young Actor at the 29th Young Artist Awards.

Cast 
 Ally Walker as Val Spencer
 Currie Graham as Jake Brenner
 Marnette Patterson as Angie
 Jordan Garrett as Nick Spencer
 Suzanne Ford as Mary Vance
 Brian Howe as Jim
 Eddie Velez as Detective Sosa

References

External links
 

2007 television films
2007 films
2007 thriller films
American thriller television films
Films directed by John Terlesky
2000s American films
2000s English-language films